Ronald Gërçaliu (born 12 February 1986) is an Albanian-born Austrian footballer who plays for FC Kufstein. Eligible to play for Albania, he chose to play for Austria after being called up by Hans Krankl in 2005.

Club career
Born in Tirana but moved to Austria in 1997, Gërçaliu came up through the ranks at Sturm Graz, becoming first-team mainstay in 2004–05 season and also played professionally for Salzburg and Austria Wien. In summer 2008 he rejoined Salzburg after only one and a half season at Austria Wien. On 28 June 2009, it was announced that Gërçaliu signed with SC Wiener Neustadt for the new season. After one season he left SC Wiener Neustadt and signed for German club FC Ingolstadt 04. On 3 January 2014 he signed a two-year contract with Universitatea Cluj and, after a season playing for SC Rheindorf Altach, in July 2015 he signed a contract with KF Tirana, the team of the city where he was born.

International career
He chose to play for Austria after being called up by Hans Krankl in 2005 and then made his debut for Austria in an August 2005 friendly match against Scotland and was a participant at Euro 2008.

Honours
Austria Wien
 Austrian Cup: 2006–07
Red Bull Salzburg
 Austrian Bundesliga: 2008–09

References

External links
 Player profile at Austria Archiv 
 
 

1986 births
Living people
FK Austria Wien players
Austrian Football Bundesliga players
Austrian footballers
Austrian expatriate footballers
Austria international footballers
Naturalised citizens of Austria
Albanian emigrants to Austria
Footballers from Tirana
Albanian footballers
SK Sturm Graz players
FC Red Bull Salzburg players
FC Ingolstadt 04 players
ŁKS Łódź players
FC Erzgebirge Aue players
FC Universitatea Cluj players
Ekstraklasa players
2. Bundesliga players
Liga I players
Expatriate footballers in Germany
Austrian expatriate sportspeople in Germany
Expatriate footballers in Poland
Austrian expatriate sportspeople in Poland
Expatriate footballers in Romania
Austrian expatriate sportspeople in Romania
UEFA Euro 2008 players
Association football fullbacks
Austrian people of Albanian descent
Kategoria Superiore players
KF Tirana players
Footballers from Styria